Robert, Rob, Bob or Bobby Morrow may  refer to:

Robert Morrow (VC) (1891–1915), Irish soldier who received the Victoria Cross.
Robert Morrow (Texas politician) (born 1964), American
Rob Morrow (born 1968), American actor and director
Bob Morrow (1946–2018), Canadian politician
Bob Morrow (American football) (1918–2003), American football player and coach
Bobby Morrow (1935–2020), American sprinter